The Lesser Antillean iguana (Iguana delicatissima) is a large arboreal lizard endemic to the Lesser Antilles. It is one of three species of lizard of the genus Iguana and is in severe decline due to habitat destruction, introduced feral predators, hunting, and hybridization with its introduced sister species, the green iguana (Iguana iguana). Successful captive breeding of this species has been limited to only two instances, as most captive-laid eggs tend to be infertile.

Other common names for it are Lesser Antillean green iguana or West Indian iguana.

Etymology and taxonomy
The generic name iguana is derived from iwana, a Spanish form of the Taino name for the species. Its specific name delicatissima is Latin for "delicate". The species was first officially described by Austrian naturalist Josephus Nicolaus Laurenti in 1768.

Anatomy and morphology

The Lesser Antilles iguana has a more blocky, shortened face than the green iguana and lacks the distinctive stripe pattern present along the green iguana's tail. The feature that most easily distinguishes these two species is the large, round scale that the green iguana has below each ear hole but which the Lesser Antillean iguana lacks.

The Lesser Antillean iguana varies in color between different island populations, but the base color tends to be gray, with green splotching on the underside. They have large pale, ivory colored scales on their heads. The jowls of males are pink and the scales around the eyes are blue. Males also have femoral pores along each inner thigh that exude pheromones during breeding season. Females are two-thirds this size.

Habitat and distribution
The Lesser Antillean iguana is found in scrub woodlands, rainforests, and mangroves throughout the Lesser Antilles on Saint Barth, Anguilla, St. Eustatius, Guadeloupe, Dominica, and Martinique. Since European settlement the species has disappeared from Sint Maarten, Saint Kitts, Nevis, Barbuda, Antigua, Marie Galante, and Îles des Saintes.

Ecology
Lesser Antillean iguanas are primarily herbivores, feeding on leaves, flowers, fruit, and growing shoots of upwards of 100 different species of plant.

Conservation

The Lesser Antillean iguana is a critically endangered species and is found on the IUCN Red List. The Lesser Antillean iguana is legally protected from hunting throughout its range, but enforcement of these regulations is extremely difficult and therefore limited. Other threats include habitat loss to agriculture and development and the introduction of feral predators such as dogs, cats, and mongooses.

The species' greatest threat is from its own relative. The green iguana has been introduced to the Lesser Antilles as an invasive species and directly competes with the Lesser Antillean iguana for food and resources. In addition, the green iguana has been interbreeding with the Lesser Antillean iguana and this hybridization has been the number one reason for the latter species' decline on numerous islands (Basse Terre and Grande Terre (Guadeloupe), St. Barthélemy, Martinique) or complete disappearance (e.g., Les Iles des Saintes). Also on St. Eustatius hybridization has been observed.
After a group of green iguanas washed ashore after hurricane Luis in 1995 on the island of Anguilla, the endemic Lesser Antillean iguana population was gone within twenty years.
Recently, non-native iguanas also arrived on Dominica, the last major stronghold of the species. These iguanas were translocated together with hurricane-aid supplies during the aftermath of Hurricane Maria in 2017.
 
Captive Lesser Antillean iguanas are currently kept at the Durrell Wildlife Conservation Trust, the Chester Zoo, the Memphis Zoo, and the San Diego Zoo's Center for Reproduction of Endangered Species. All individuals originate from the Commonwealth of Dominica. Breeding and keeping the species in captivity is difficult. Mating and egg laying have occurred at each institution, but most of the eggs have been infertile; however, a single individual was successfully hatched at the Durrell Wildlife Conservation Trust in 1997 and in 2000 eight iguanas were hatched. Following on from this success, 11 iguanas hatched at Durrell in 2016 and they will be sent to zoos across Europe in an effort to promote and support the urgent conservation work for this species. In 2018 four captured iguanas from Sint Eustatius were sent to Blijdorp zoo in Rotterdam, The Netherlands for a breeding programme.

References

External links
 
 
Saint Barth Fauna & Flora 

Iguana
Reptiles of the Caribbean
Lizards of the Caribbean
Fauna of the Lesser Antilles
Endangered fauna of North America
Reptiles described in 1768
Taxa named by Josephus Nicolaus Laurenti